The 31st Vehbi Emre Tournament 2013, was a wrestling event held in Istanbul, Turkey between 2 and 3 February 2013.

This international tournament includes competition men's Greco-Roman wrestling. This ranking tournament was held in honor of Turkish Wrestler and manager Vehbi Emre.

Medal table

Greco-Roman

Participating nations

References 

Vehbi Emre
Vehbi Emre and Hamit Kaplan
Sports competitions in Istanbul
International wrestling competitions hosted by Turkey
Vehbi Emre & Hamit Kaplan Tournament